List of volleyball clubs in Spain sorted by division:

Superliga Masculina 2007/08 season
 Arona Playa Las Américas
 CAI Voleibol Teruel
 CV Almoradí
 CV Elche
 Ciudad de Medio Ambiente Soria
 Drac Palma Pórtol
 Fábregas Sport Multicaja
 Jusan Canarias
 Tarragona SPSP
 7 Islas Vecindario
 Unicaja Arukasur
 Universidad de Granada

Superliga Femenina 2007/08 season
 CV Albacete
 Ciudad Las Palmas Cantur
 Voleibol Murcia 2005
 Voleibol Benidorm
 IBSA Club Voleibol
 Ícaro Palma
 Jamper Aguere
 Spar Tenerife Marichal
 Universidad de Burgos
 Valeriano Alles Menorca
 VB Bargas Atalia Sarrión PSG
 Voley Sanse

See also
 Volleyball in Spain

 
Volleyball
Volleyball